The International Association of Hydrological Sciences (IAHS) is a non-profit non-governmental scientific organisation committed to serving the science of hydrology and the worldwide community of hydrologists. The IAHS was established in 1922, and presently claims a membership in excess of 9,000 with members in over 150 countries.

Ten international scientific commissions deal with the hydrological cycle, water resources, and specific techniques. Other working groups and initiatives address particular issues.

Governance
IAHS is one of the eight associations that comprise the International Union of Geodesy and Geophysics. In accordance with the IAHS statutes and by-laws, the IAHS officers and commissioners are elected every four years by national representatives at the IAHS plenary during the IUGG General Assembly

National representation
Official contact between the IAHS and member countries is via the national representative in each country who acts as a focal point and channel for communication. If there is a national IUGG committee (usually appointed by the national academy of sciences or equivalent), the IAHS representative is nominated by it, or its IAHS subcommittee. Member countries may also appoint national correspondents of the Commissions.

Publications
IAHS Press fulfills the IAHS mission of worldwide dissemination of research results and practice, and raises funds, by publishing and selling the Hydrological Sciences Journal and three book series: the Red Book series, Special Publications (Blue Books) and the Benchmark series.  Since 2014, the Red Book series has been published online open-access by Copernicus Publications as the Proceedings of the International Association of Hydrological Sciences (PIAHS).   The IAHS electronic news is distributed free to the members.

Finance

IAHS is a UK registered charity; all revenues are used to support the aims of the Association. The greater part of IAHS’ funding is raised through the publication of the Hydrological Sciences Journal.

IAHS works closely with IUGG, International Council for Science (ICSU), UNESCO, World Meteorological Organization (WMO), International Atomic Energy Agency (IAEA) and WWC, and often collaborates with organisations such as International Association of Hydrogeologists (IAH), International Association of Hydraulic Engineering and Research (IAHR) and Inland Waterways Association (IWA).

Hydrological decades
IAHS supports hydrological research decades that aim to encourage hydrological research around the globe under a common theme.

Predictions in Ungauged Basins
The Predictions in Ungauged Basins (PUB) scientific decade lasted from 2003 to 2012. It was described as the "first scientific endeavour to track and quantify the world's water supply". Results from the PUB decade benefited other scientific initiatives such as HEPEX.

Panta Rhei: change in hydrology and society
The Panta Rhei scientific decade runs from 2013–2022. The name 'Panta Rhei' means 'Everything Flows'. The Panta Rhei decade focuses on scientific understanding, prediction and water management in rapidly changing environmental systems, with an explicit focus on the role of humans in the water cycle. The theme and the name of the Panta Rhei decade was identified through a community discussion and Panta Rhei was launched in 2013. During the first Panta Rhei biennium 2013-2015, 31 working groups were formed on diverse topics related to hydrology, society and change. Panta Rhei shares some common aims with the UNESCO International Hydrological Programme (IHP) Phase VIII on Water Security.

References

External links
 IAHS Homepage
 IUGG Homepage
 UNESCO Hydrology IHP
 International Association of Hydrogeologists
 international Association for Hydro-Environment Engineering and Research
 World Meteorological Organization
 Hydrological Sciences Journal
 Proceedings of the International Association of Hydrological Sciences

Geology organizations
International scientific organizations
International organisations based in the United Kingdom
1922 establishments in England